The 2009 Turkish flash floods were a series of flash floods that occurred on 9 September 2009 in and around Istanbul, Tekirdağ, and the rest of the Marmara Region of Turkey. The floods led to the death of at least 31 people and the cost of damage has been estimated as being in excess of $70 million.

Background 
The floods followed a two-day period of heavy rainfall, the worst the country had seen for 80 years, which had begun on 7 September.  During the evening and night of 8 September the rain became increasingly strong leading to flash floods across the city early on the morning of 9 September, with low-lying areas to the west of the city being the worst affected.  Turkey's Minister of Environment and Forests, Veysel Eroğlu, described the rain as the "worst in 500 years". The floods were created by the Marmara sea, an inlet of the Mediterranean sea.

Impacts 
At least 31 people were killed across the region and dozens were stranded in cars or on rooftops and an unknown number remain missing.  Three of the deaths occurred in western suburbs of Istanbul on 8 September, 21 people lost their lives in Istanbul on 9 September and seven more in neighboring Tekirdağ Province, where two further people are missing.  Muammer Güler, governor of Istanbul, said 20 people were injured by the floods.  Officials and experts have blamed the high death toll on unplanned urbanization in Istanbul, which has seen buildings constructed in river beds, and an inadequate infrastructure system.
 
In some places the water reached a metre (3 ft) in height, cutting access to Istanbul's main airport and the highway running to Bulgaria and Greece. According to state-run news agency Anatolia Agency, one building collapsed, although there were no reported casualties. Police were deployed to prevent looting from abandoned shops and factories, although the press has recorded instances of looting from vehicles. In north-west Turkey two bridges on the Bahçeköy–Saray highway were also destroyed by floods at the same time.  More than 200 cars have been washed into the Marmara Sea and dozens of trucks damaged.

Emergency response 
Since the floods began on Tuesday, more than 1,000 people have been rescued by emergency services. Turkish officials have also stated that more than 900 firefighters and rescuers are working in the affected areas, backed up by a fleet of more than 200 vehicles and 30 dinghies.  Interior Minister Beşir Atalay has pledged to compensate residents of Istanbul affected by the floods.  The Red Crescent Society has dispatched tents, blankets, food and personnel to the area to help survivors.

International reaction 
  – Greece is "ready to send any kind of aid" to the area according to the Greek ambassador to Turkey and according to the Greek Foreign Minister "to extend every type of assistance to the Turkish people and officials", but made no note to tourists.

See also 
 List of deadliest floods

References

External links 

Drought-stricken İstanbul hit by floods

Floods in Turkey
Turkish Flash Floods, 2009
Turkish Flash Floods, 2009
Turkish Flash Floods, 2009
Marmara Region
2009 disasters in Turkey